William Francis Sheahan  (3 September 1895 – 27 December 1975) also known as Bill Sheahan or Billy Sheahan, was an Australian politician, elected as a member of the New South Wales Legislative Assembly.

Early life
Born in Tumut, New South Wales, the son of the publicans of the hotel at Jugiong, Sheahan attended schools in Tumut and St Patrick's College, Goulburn.

Sheahan gained work as a clerk in the Crown Law Department in 1914 before enlisting in the Australian Imperial Force in 1916, serving in France and Flanders. Following World War I, Sheahan returned to the Crown Law Department, working there until 1930, when he received a Bachelor of Laws at the University of Sydney and established a large criminal law practice. Called to the bar in 1930, Sheahan was made a Queen's Counsel in 1953.

Political career
Elected as the Labor Party member for the New South Wales Electoral district of Yass in 1941, Sheahan served in parliament until 1973 (from 1950 as the member for Burrinjuck), holding the portfolios of Attorney-General of New South Wales, Minister for Transport and Minister for Health between 1950 and 1965. His son Terry Sheahan succeeded him as Member for Burrinjuck.

Later life and legacy
Sheahan died in Sydney and was buried at Jugiong Cemetery.

This bridge was duplicated in 2010.

References

 

1895 births
1975 deaths
Australian people of Irish descent
Members of the New South Wales Legislative Assembly
Australian Labor Party members of the Parliament of New South Wales
20th-century Australian politicians
Attorneys General of New South Wales
Australian barristers
Public servants of New South Wales
Australian King's Counsel
20th-century King's Counsel
Australian military personnel of World War I
Australian Army soldiers
University of Sydney alumni